Antena 7 (formerly known as Antena Latina) is a television network in the Dominican Republic owned and operated by Albavision, it is headquartered in Santo Domingo. It began to broadcast on October 16, 1999 after the shutdown of the former RAHINTEL.

History 
In 1999, Radio HIN Televisión (Rahintel) was in apparent decline, after years surviving without new programs and without the support of its parent company, Grupo Financiero Universal, which had gone bankrupt in the late 1980s. The animated series, which had been the last higher-class programs with high audience in Rahintel, had been withdrawn.

Due to the entire situation, Rahintel was put up for sale in 1999, being the Bonetti Group who decided to purchase channel 7. After the financial operation was completed, Rahintel quietly left the air in April 1999.

From then on, channel 7 was partially closed and with provisional programming that announced the arrival of a new channel 7, which was announced in the summer of 1999 as Antena Latina. After months of intense promotion, in which a younger approach was noted for channel 7, Antena Latina airs on October 16, 1999.

The arrival of Antena Latina introduced new technologies to Dominican television, such as the complement of the first and only virtual studio in the Caribbean area, a breakthrough for those times. In addition, its programming contained programs that gave the channel a large audience. One of the most successful programs were WWE wrestling, which was broadcast again in the country after several years of absence.

Over the years, Antena Latina has strengthened itself as a premium channel in local production. This was evidenced by productions such as El bachatón (produced by Alfonso Rodríguez), and later, in productions such as Noche de luz, Focus, Grandiosa, Rica Loquera, among many others. Operated by Albavision Antena 21 was born in 2002 with a television format which combines design and technology to provide a quality programmer for its television audience. Publishing the latest news from the Dominican Republic.

In 2012, Daniel Sarcos entered the channel, with his program Aqui se Habla Español.

In 2014, the departure of the SIN Group was announced after the acquisition made by Albavisión, acquireing the shares of Antena Latina (today Antena 7) for 47.5% after the Bonetti Group sold through Albavision due to the restructuring process. Later it also acquired Antena 21's license.

In 2016 the channel slightly changed the logo and the graphic line, changing its name to Antena 7, as well as a new slogan: Llegando a ti (Coming to you).

References

External links 
  

Television stations in the Dominican Republic
Television channels and stations established in 1999
Spanish-language television stations
1999 establishments in the Dominican Republic